Gao Kang (Simplified Chinese: 高亢; Traditional Chinese: 高亢; Pinyin: Gāo Kàng) (born January 1957) is a politician of the People's Republic of China. He was born in Shenyang, Liaoning, and is currently the District Governor of Qingpu, Shanghai.

Education & Background
He graduated from Fudan University. He also holds both qualifications of senior economist and senior political professional. Gao joined the CPC in May, 1977 and has been working since March, 1975.

Sources and notes

 The official website of Government of Qingpu

See also
Qingpu
Politics of the People's Republic of China

1957 births
Politicians from Shenyang
People's Republic of China politicians from Liaoning
Fudan University alumni
Living people
Political office-holders in Shanghai
Chinese Communist Party politicians from Liaoning